Odontobutis hikimius is a species of freshwater sleeper endemic to Japan.

References

Odontobutis
Freshwater fish of Japan
Fish described in 2002